Mitromorpha fusiformis is a species of sea snail, a marine gastropod mollusk in the family Mitromorphidae.

Description
The length of the shell attains 12.5 mm.

Distribution
This marine species occurs off the Philippines.

References

 Chino M. & Stahlschmidt P. (2009) New turrid species of the Mitromorpha-complex (Gastropoda: Conidae: Clathurellinae) from the Philippines and Japan. Visaya 2(4): 63–82

External links
 

fusiformis
Gastropods described in 2009